Guigo de Ponte, also known as Guigues du Pont, was a Carthusian monk of the Grande Chartreuse. Little is known about him, but he probably professed there in 1271, and died in 1297.

He is known for his treatise De vita contemplativa, also known as De Contemplatione. This has sometimes been attributed to Guigo I (d.1136), the fifth prior of the Grande Chartreuse. However, it cannot have been written by Guigo I, because it refers to several writings of thirteenth-century scholastic theology, as well as to Hugh of Balma's Viae Syon Lugent. Part of it (Book II, chapters 1–5) was taken up nearly verbatim by the fourteenth-century Carthusian Ludolph of Saxony (d.1377) in his Vita Christi. One of those who read Ludolph was Ignatius of Loyola, so indirectly, Guigo's thought entered early modern Catholic spiritual writing. Though it was known and used by a number of late medieval Carthusians, though (as well as Ludolph of Saxony it is used by Denis of Rijkel, and possibly Nicholas Kempf), it survives in only five manuscripts, so was clearly not widely read outside these circles.

References

Further reading

Carthusian Spirituality: The Writings of Hugh of Balma and Guigo de Ponte, (New York: Paulist Press, 1997) [An English translation of De vita contemplativa]
Dennis Martin, Fifteenth Century Carthusian Reform: The World of Nicholas Kempf, pp181f
Philippe DuPont, Guigues du Pont, Traité sur la contemplation, Analecta Cartusiana 72, (Salzburg, 1985) [A critical edition of the Latin text, with French translation]

Carthusians
1290s deaths
Medieval Christian devotional writers
Year of birth unknown
13th-century French people
13th-century French writers
13th-century Latin writers